The Goseong Yi clan (Hangul: 고성 이씨, Hanja: 固城 李氏) is one of the Korean clans. Their bon-gwan is in Goseong County, South Gyeongsang Province. According to the census held in 2000, the number of members was 89,254. Their founder was Yi Hwang, who was appointed as Prince of Goseong after he successfully beating the Khitans.

Notable members
Royal Consort Geun of the Goseong Yi clan, 14th-century Queen of Goryeo.

See also 
 Korean clan names of foreign origin

References

External links 
 

 
Yi clans
Korean clan names of Chinese origin